The Technische Hochschule Nürnberg Georg Simon Ohm  (shortened TH Nürnberg; English name Nuremberg Institute of Technology Georg Simon Ohm) is a public Technische Hochschule in Nuremberg, Bavaria. With its 12,200 students and 1,800 faculty members, it is the second biggest Technische Hochschule in Bavaria.

The university got its name in honor of Georg Simon Ohm who was a professor and headmaster of the predecessor of the Hochschule, the Polytechnische Schule, between 1839 and 1849.

The logo of the Technische Hochschule is the Ω as a reference to Ohm the SI derived unit for electric resistance named after Georg Simon Ohm.

The main campus is located around the Wöhrder Wiese city park close to  Nuremberg's downtown area. There are more facilities distributed around the city. They also contain a cafeteria and a university owned kindergarten called Milliohm.

Faculties
 Applied Chemistry
 Applied Mathematics, Physics and General Science
 Architecture
 Business administration
 Civil Engineering
 Computer Science
 Design
 Electrical Engineering, Precision Engineering, Information Technology
 Materials Science
 Mechanical Engineering and Building Services Engineering
 Social Science
 Process Engineering

External links
 Official website of the university

Nuremberg
Technical universities and colleges in Germany
Buildings and structures in Nuremberg
Universities of Applied Sciences in Germany
Educational institutions established in 1971
Education in Nuremberg
1971 establishments in West Germany